Lohli is a village in Hilauli block of Unnao district, Uttar Pradesh, India. As of 2011, its population is 827, in 147 households, and it has one primary school and no healthcare facilities.

The 1961 census recorded Lohli (here spelled "Lohali") as comprising 1 hamlets, with a total population of 234 (139 male and 95 female), in 65 households and 64 physical houses. The area of the village was given as 379 acres.

References

Villages in Unnao district